Tank Man (also known as the Unknown Protester or Unknown Rebel) is the nickname of an unidentified Chinese man who stood in front of a column of Type 59 tanks leaving Tiananmen Square in Beijing on June 5, 1989, the day after the Chinese government's violent crackdown on the Tiananmen protests. As the lead tank maneuvered to pass by the man, he repeatedly shifted his position in order to obstruct the tank's attempted path around him. The incident was filmed and shared to a worldwide audience. Internationally, it is considered one of the most iconic images of all time. Inside China, the image and the accompanying events are subject to censorship.

There is no reliable information about the identity or fate of the man; the story of what happened to the tank crew is also unknown. At least one witness has stated that Tank Man was not the only person to have blocked the tanks during the protest, but Tank Man is unique in that he is the only one who was photographed and recorded on video.

Obstruction 
At the northeast edge of Tiananmen Square, along Chang'an Avenue, shortly after noon on June 5, 1989, the day after the Chinese government's violent crackdown on the Tiananmen protests, "Tank Man" stood in the middle of the wide avenue, directly in the path of a column of approaching Type 59 tanks. Stuart Franklin, who was on assignment for Time magazine, told The New York Times: "At some point, shots were fired and the tanks carried on down the road toward us, leaving Tiananmen Square behind, until blocked by a lone protester." He wore a white shirt and black trousers, and he held two shopping bags. As the tanks came to a stop, the man gestured at them with one of the bags. In response, the lead tank attempted to drive around the man, but the man repeatedly stepped into the path of the tank in a show of nonviolent action. After repeatedly attempting to go around, the lead tank stopped its engines, and the armored vehicles behind it followed suit. There was a short pause with the man and the tanks having reached a quiet, still impasse.

Having successfully brought the column to a halt, the man climbed onto the hull of the buttoned-up lead tank and, after briefly stopping at the driver's hatch, appeared in video footage of the incident to call into various ports in the tank's turret. He then climbed atop the turret and seemed to have a short conversation with a crew member at the gunner's hatch. After ending the conversation, the man descended from the tank. The tank commander briefly emerged from his hatch, and the tanks restarted their engines, ready to continue on. At that point, the man, who was still standing within a meter (yard) or two from the side of the lead tank, leapt in front of the vehicle once again and quickly re-established the man–tank standoff.

Video footage shows two figures in blue pulling the man away and disappearing with him into a nearby crowd; the tanks continued on their way. Eyewitnesses are unsure who pulled him aside. Charlie Cole, who was there for Newsweek, said it was the Chinese government PSB (the police), while Jan Wong, who was there for The Globe and Mail, thought that the men who pulled him away were concerned bystanders.

Identity and fate 
Little is publicly known of the man's identity or that of the commander of the lead tank. Shortly after the incident, British tabloid Sunday Express named him as "Wang Weilin", a 19-year-old student who was later charged with "political hooliganism" and "attempting to subvert members of the People's Liberation Army". This claim has been rejected by internal Chinese Communist Party documents, which reported that they could not find the man, according to the Hong Kong-based Information Center for Human Rights. One party member was quoted as saying: "We can't find him. We got his name from journalists. We have checked through computers but can't find him among the dead or among those in prison." Numerous theories have sprung up as to the man's identity and current whereabouts.

There are several conflicting stories about what happened to him after the demonstration. In a speech to the President's Club in 1999, Bruce Herschensohn, former deputy special assistant to President Richard Nixon, alleged that he was executed 14 days later; other sources alleged he was executed by firing squad a few months after the Tiananmen Square protests. In Red China Blues: My Long March from Mao to Now, Jan Wong writes that she believes from her interactions with the government press that they have "no idea who he was either" and that he is still alive somewhere on the mainland. Another theory is that he escaped to Taiwan and remains employed there as an archaeologist in the National Palace Museum. This was first reported by the Yonhap news agency in South Korea.

The Chinese government has made few statements about the incident or the people involved. The government denounced him as a "scoundrel" once on state television, but it was never shown publicly again. In a 1990 interview with Barbara Walters, then-General Secretary of the Chinese Communist Party Jiang Zemin was asked what became of the man. Jiang first stated (through an interpreter), "I can't confirm whether this young man you mentioned was arrested or not", and then replied in English, "I think [that he was] never killed." The government also argued that the incident evidenced the "humanity" of the country's military.

In a 2000 interview with Mike Wallace, Jiang said, "He was never arrested." He then stated, "I don't know where he is now." He also emphasized that the tank stopped and did not run the young man over.

Censorship 

A PBS interview of six experts observed that the memory of the Tiananmen Square protests appears to have faded in China, especially among younger Chinese people, due to government censorship. Images of the protest on the Internet have been censored in China. When undergraduate students at Beijing University, which was at the center of the incident, were shown copies of the iconic photograph 16 years later, they were "genuinely mystified". One of the students said that the image was "artwork". It is noted in the documentary Frontline: The Tank Man that he whispered to the student next to him "89".

It has been suggested that the "Unknown Rebel", if still alive, would never have made himself known as he may have been unaware of his international recognition due to the Chinese media suppression of events relating to the government protests.

At and after the events in the square, the local public security bureau treated members of the international press roughly, confiscating and destroying all the film they could find, and forced the signing of confessions to offences such as photography during martial law, punishable by long imprisonment.

On August 20, 2020, a trailer for Call of Duty: Black Ops Cold War showed footage of Tank Man. On video platforms in China like Bilibili, the segment of the trailer was replaced with a black screen. The next day, Activision Blizzard released a shorter version of the trailer worldwide that did not include the scene.

On June 4, 2021, the 32nd anniversary of the 1989 Tiananmen Square massacre, searches for the Tank Man image and videos were censored by Microsoft's Bing search engine worldwide. Hours after Microsoft acknowledged the issue, the search returned only pictures of tanks elsewhere in the world. Search engines that license results from Microsoft such as DuckDuckGo and Yahoo faced similar issues. Microsoft said the issue was "due to an accidental human error." The director of Human Rights Watch, Kenneth Roth, said the idea that it was an inadvertent error is "hard to believe". David Greene, Civil Liberties Director at Electronic Frontier Foundation, said that content moderation was impossible to do perfectly and "egregious mistakes are made all the time", but he further elaborated that "At worst, this was purposeful suppression at the request of a powerful state."

Photographic versions 
Five photographers (one of whom did not share his material for 20 years) managed to capture the event on film that was later confiscated by the PSB. On June 4, 2009, the fifth photographer released an image of the scene taken from ground level.

The widest coverage of the event and one of the best-known photographs of the event appearing in both Time and Life magazines, was documented by Stuart Franklin. He was on the same balcony as Charlie Cole, and his roll of film was smuggled out of the country by a French student, concealed in a box of tea.

The image was taken using a Nikon FE2 camera through a Nikkor 400mm 5.6 ED-IF lens and TC-301 teleconverter. Circumstances were against the photographer who recalled that the picture was almost not taken. Widener was injured, suffering from the flu and running out of film. A friend (by the name of Kirk) hastily obtained a roll of Fuji 100 ASA color negative film, allowing him to make the shot. Though he was concerned that his shots were no good, his image was syndicated to many newspapers around the world and was said to have appeared on the front page of all European papers. He was also nominated for the Pulitzer Prize but did not win. Nevertheless, his photograph has widely been known as one of the most iconic photographs of all time.

Charlie Cole, working for Newsweek and on the same balcony as Stuart Franklin, hid his roll of film containing Tank Man in a Beijing Hotel toilet, sacrificing an unused roll of film and undeveloped images of wounded protesters after the PSB raided his room, destroyed the two aforementioned rolls of film and forced him to sign a confession to photography during martial law, an imprisonable offence. Cole was able to retrieve the roll and have it sent to Newsweek. He was awarded the 1990 World Press Photo of the Year and the picture was featured in Life "100 Photographs That Changed the World" in 2003.

On June 4, 2009, in connection with the 20th anniversary of the protests, Associated Press reporter Terril Jones revealed a photo he had taken showing the Tank Man from ground level, a different angle from all of the other known photos of the Tank Man. Jones wrote that he was not aware of what he had captured until a month later when printing his photos.

Arthur Tsang Hin Wah of Reuters took several shots from room 1111 of the Beijing Hotel, but only the shot of Tank Man climbing the tank was chosen. It was not until several hours later that the photo of the man standing in front of the tank was finally chosen. When the staff noticed Widener's work, they re-checked Tsang's negative to see if it was of the same moment as Widener's. On March 20, 2013, in an interview by the Hong Kong Press Photographers Association (HKPPA), Tsang told the story and added further detail. He told HKPPA that on the night of June 3, 1989, he was beaten by students while taking photos and was bleeding. A foreign photographer accompanying him suddenly said, "I am not gonna die for your country", and left. Tsang returned to the hotel. When he decided to go out again, the public security stopped him, so he stayed in his room, stood next to the window and eventually witnessed the Tank Man and took several shots of the event.

In addition to the photography, video footage of the scene was recorded and transmitted across the globe. Australian Broadcasting Corporation (ABC) cameraman Willie Phua, Cable News Network (CNN) cameraman Jonathan Schaer and National Broadcasting Company (NBC) cameraman Tony Wasserman appear to be the only television cameramen who captured the scene. ABC correspondents Max Uechtritz and Peter Cave were the journalists reporting from the balcony.

After witnessing an incident on June 3, where a Chinese APC ran over several people before protesters killed the crew and destroyed the vehicle, many journalists and photographers believed the protests had already reached their peak, causing many to leave the area before the "tank man" incident occurred.

Legacy 
In April 1998, Time included the "Unknown Rebel" in a feature titled "Time 100: The Most Important People of the Century". In November 2016, Time included the photograph by Jeff Widener in "Time 100: The Most Influential Images of All Time".

In creative works 
In the 1999 Crosby, Stills, Nash & Young song "Stand and Be Counted", from the album Looking Forward, David Crosby sings of his gratitude to Tank Man, whose photograph he has had framed and mounted.

A similar scene is depicted in the music video for "Club Foot" (2004) by the English rock band Kasabian.

A fictionalized version of the fates of both the Tank Man and a soldier in the tank is told in Lucy Kirkwood's 2013 play Chimerica, which premiered at the Almeida Theatre from May 20, 2013 to July 6, 2013.

On June 4, 2013, Sina Weibo, China's most popular microblog, blocked terms whose English translations are "today", "tonight", "June 4", and "big yellow duck". If these were searched for, a message appeared stating that, in accordance with relevant laws, statutes, and policies, the results of the search could not be shown. The censorship occurred because a photoshopped version of Tank Man, in which rubber ducks replaced the tanks, had been circulating around Twitter—a reference to Florentijn Hofman's Rubber Duck sculpture, which at that time was floating in Hong Kong's Victoria Harbour.

In April 2019, Leica Camera released an advert depicting photographers in intense political climates, including 1989 China. The five-minute short ends with a photographer shooting from a hotel window with the Tank Man image reflected in his lens despite the fact that the original photograph was taken with a Nikon camera. Following censorship of the Leica brand on Sina Weibo, Leica revoked the advert and sought to distance themselves from it.

See also 
 30th anniversary of the 1989 Tiananmen Square protests and massacre
 August Landmesser
 Chinese democracy movement
 Faris Odeh
 History of the People's Republic of China
 Human rights in China
 List of peace activists
 List of photographs considered the most important
 Tankie

References

Further reading 
 June Fourth: The True Story, Tian'anmen Papers/Zhongguo Liusi Zhenxiang Volumes 1–2 (Chinese edition), Zhang Liang, .
 Red China Blues: My Long March from Mao to Now, Jan Wong, Doubleday, 1997, trade paperback, 416 pages,  (Contains, besides extensive autobiographical material, an eyewitness account of the Tiananmen crackdown and the basis for an estimate of the number of casualties.)
 The Tiananmen Papers: The Chinese Leadership's Decision to Use Force Against their Own People—In their Own Words, Compiled by Zhang Liang, Edited by Andrew J. Nathan and Perry Link, with an afterword by Orville Schell, PublicAffairs, New York, 2001, hardback, 514 pages,  (An extensive review and synopsis of The Tiananmen Papers in the journal Foreign Affairs may be found at Review and synopsis in the journal Foreign Affairs.)

External links
 China still gets annoyed with images showing the famous Tiananmen Square ‘Tank Man,’ 30 years after he became a symbol of the government’s brutality
 Raw video of the Tank Man incident (CNN on YouTube)
 The Stuart Franklin photo at Life magazine 100 photos that changed the world.
  Professor disclosed heroic Wang Weilin still in world, dajiyuan.com. Retrieved June 1, 2006.
 PBS Frontline documentary "The Tank Man", 2006, Program viewable online. Last Retrieved July 29, 2008.
 The photos that defined a massacre, BBC
 John McBeth (13 Sep, 2019) Tank man photographer Charlie Cole died in Bali aged 64

1989 Tiananmen Square protesters
1989 Tiananmen Square protests and massacre
1989 works
1989 in art
1989 films
1980s photographs
Associated Press
Chinese dissidents
Photographs of protests
Color photographs
Photography in China
Possibly living people
People notable for being the subject of a specific photograph
Unidentified people
Political controversies in China
Television controversies in China